Elections to Dacorum Borough Council in Hertfordshire, England were held on 3 May 2007. The whole council was up for election with boundary changes since the last election in 2003 reducing the number of seats by one. The Conservative Party remained in overall control of the council after winning 44 of the 51 seats which they partly attributed to national events, while the Liberal Democrats lost 2 seats but were pleased to become the official opposition.

Election result

Ward results

References

2007 Dacorum election result
Ward results
County Council Election 2007: Dacorum Borough Council

2007
2007 English local elections
2000s in Hertfordshire